João Ricardo Riedi (born 6 September 1988), known as João Ricardo, is a Brazilian footballer who plays as a goalkeeper for Fortaleza.

Club career
Born in Mariano Moro, Rio Grande do Sul, João Ricardo made his senior debut while at Concórdia in 2008. He moved to Brusque shortly after, being regularly used during his two-year spell.

In 2010 João Ricardo joined Goiânia, but returned to his previous club later in the year. He went on to appear with Brusque in 2011 Campeonato Brasileiro Série C, as a starter.

On 1 August 2012 João Ricardo signed for Paysandu, after a brief stint at Marcílio Dias.

On 12 December 2012 João Ricardo moved to Veranópolis. After being an undisputed starter, he joined Icasa.

On 4 January 2014, João Ricardo signed for Paraná, also in the second level. On 8 June of that year, he moved to fellow league team América Mineiro, achieving promotion to Série A in 2015.

On 2 January 2019, João Ricardo joined Chapecoense on a two-year deal, as a replacement to Genoa-bound Jandrei. In April, he was suspended until further notice after testing positive in a doping exam.

Honours
 América Mineiro
 Campeonato Mineiro: 2016
 Campeonato Brasileiro Série B: 2017

References

External links
Futebol de Goyaz profile 

1988 births
Living people
Sportspeople from Rio Grande do Sul
Brazilian footballers
Association football goalkeepers
Campeonato Brasileiro Série A players
Campeonato Brasileiro Série B players
Campeonato Brasileiro Série C players
Campeonato Brasileiro Série D players
Brusque Futebol Clube players
Goiânia Esporte Clube players
Clube Náutico Marcílio Dias players
Paysandu Sport Club players
Associação Desportiva Recreativa e Cultural Icasa players
Paraná Clube players
América Futebol Clube (MG) players
Associação Chapecoense de Futebol players
Ceará Sporting Club players
Fortaleza Esporte Clube players
Doping cases in association football